Limitless is the second EP by NCT 127, the Seoul based sub-unit of South Korean boy band NCT. It marked their first album as a nine-member group, since the addition of Doyoung and Johnny in 2016. It was released on January 6, 2017 digitally and physically on January 9, by SM Entertainment.

The mini-album was a commercial success topping the Gaon Album Chart and Billboard's US World Albums Chart. The EP has sold 121,109 physical copies as of December 2017. The lead single, "Limitless" was named by Dazed Digital as one of the top  20 best K-Pop songs of 2017.

Background and release
On December 27, 2016, NCT 127 announced their second extended play, Limitless. It also introduced Doyoung (who had previously debuted in NCT U) and SM Rookies' Johnny as new members of NCT 127. Music video teasers were released for each member from December 27, 2016 until January 3, 2017.
Two music videos of the title track "Limitless" were released on January 5.
The EP was digitally released on January 7, 2017 it was physically released on January 9.

The song 'Good Thing' was released before for a collaboration with W Korea and Esteem models. Only Yuta, Taeyong, Jaehyun, Mark, and Winwin participated from NCT and the video was released on December 5, 2016.

Promotion
NCT 127 had their first comeback stage on M Countdown on January 5 where they performed "Limitless" and the B-side track "Good Thing". They held their first fansign for Limitless on January 12, 8:30PM KST at Seoul Women's Plaza.

Commercial performance 
NCT #127 Limitless entered at number one on the Gaon Album Chart on the chart issue dated January 8–14, 2017. In the US, the mini-album topped Billboard's World Albums chart for the week ending January 28, 2017 and also entered at number four on Billboard's Heatseekers Album chart.

The title track, "Limitless", entered at number four on Billboard's World Digital Songs chart for the week ending January 28, 2017.

Track listing
Credits adapted from Naver

Charts

Sales and certifications

Release history

References

2017 EPs
SM Entertainment EPs
Korean-language EPs
Electropop EPs
Dance-pop EPs
Genie Music EPs
NCT 127 albums